is a major interchange railway station on the Ainokaze Toyama Railway Line in Takaoka, Toyama, Japan, operated by Ainokaze Toyama Railway.

Lines

Limited express services
There is no limited express services at the station as the city of Takaoka is served by the Hokuriku Shinkansen at Shin-Takaoka Station. Prior to the opening of the Shinkansen in 2015, the station was served by the following limited express services.
 Thunderbird
 Hakutaka
 Hokuetsu

Station layout
The station has three island platforms and one side platform serving a total of seven tracks. The station has a staffed ticket office.

Platforms

Adjacent stations

History
Takaoka Station opened on 1 November 1898.

Work started in October 2007 to rebuild the station with an overpass connecting the north and south sides. The new overhead station building was completed in August 2011. Remodelling of the surrounding area was scheduled to be completed by early 2015.

Surrounding area

Kojokoen Entrance (north side)
 Takaoka Station (Manyosen Takaoka Kido Line tram stop)
 Takaoka Kojokoen Park
 Imizu Shrine
 Takaoka Art Museum

Zuiryuji Entrance (south side)
 Zuiryuji Temple

References

External links

Railway stations in Toyama Prefecture
Stations of West Japan Railway Company
Railway stations in Japan opened in 1898
Takaoka, Toyama